James Duckworth defeated Liam Broady 5-7, 6-3, 6-2 in the final.

Seeds

Draw

Finals

Top half

Bottom half

References
 Main Draw
 Qualifying Draw

Charlottesville Men's Pro Challenger - Singles
2014 Singles